Doris Metaxa Howard (née Metaxa; 12 June 1911 – 7 September 2007) was a French tennis player of the 1930s.

In 1932, she won Wimbledon title in the women's doubles with Belgian Josane Sigart against Elizabeth Ryan and Helen Jacobs, one year after a finals defeat with the same partner.

Two weeks after this success, she married the British rugby player Peter Dunsmore Howard.

Grand Slam finals

Doubles: 2 (1 title, 1 runner-up)

References

External links
 National Portrait Gallery image of Doris Metaxa and family

1911 births
2007 deaths
French female tennis players
French people of Greek descent
Wimbledon champions (pre-Open Era)
Grand Slam (tennis) champions in women's doubles
20th-century French women